Geoffrey Goodwin is a television and digital executive who has been active for 20 years in both the UK industry and his native Canada. Geoffrey was Head of Strategy for Drama, Entertainment, Comedy, Children’s and Film at the BBC from 2003 to 2007. He also wrote the BBC’s under 18s strategy with Andy Parfitt that helped set out the case for the BBC’s license fee negotiations in 2007. In 2007 Geoffrey set up BBC Switch; a multi-platform brand aimed at teenagers, which he ran for four years.  In January 2013, after working for the then CEO of BBC Worldwide John Smith, Geoffrey founded his own production and talent management company, 40 Partners LTD.

Geoffrey is also Vice-Chairman of Liverpool Institute of Performing Arts and a member of BAFTA.

Early career

Goodwin began his television career in 1994 as a runner on the CBC production of Alice Munro’s Lives of Girls and Women. He subsequently worked at Paragon Entertainment Corporation as a Production Coordinator. After three years, Goodwin moved on to work as Executive Assistant to the Producers Frank Siracusa and Paul Gross on the Paul Haggis originated Canadian crime drama Due South, and in season 2 provided the voice for recurring character Diefenbaker. After two seasons on Due South, Goodwin went to work for the Canadian-American media company Alliance Atlantis in corporate communications and development before moving to the UK and earning an MBA from the University of Edinburgh in 2000.

BBC Head of Strategy, "DEC"

After working as a media consultant in London at IXL and BBC Ventures for various blue chip companies, Goodwin took on the role of Head of Strategy for BBC Drama, Entertainment, Comedy, Children’s and Film (“DEC”), reporting to Alan Yentob. During this time, Goodwin worked closely with BBC Programme Department Heads and other BBC Executive Directors to develop editorial, business and financial strategy across DEC programme genres - a circa £500 million production entity that included 2 digital TV channels and BBC Films.
 
Goodwin also lead several pan-BBC projects, including the BBC Creative Future Under 18s workstream with Andy Parfitt.

During his time as Head of Strategy for ‘DEC’, Goodwin drove strategy of digital investment into “DEC” related programme areas, helping launch some of the first and most successful digital brands of the BBC, including BBC Fictionlab, BBC Collective and the BBC Film Network.

In February 2006 Geoffrey wrote the BBC's film strategy for Alan Yentob, which included a massive £100 million boost for the British film industry, in the hope of producing more hits like Billie Elliot.

BBC Switch

In 2007, in a return to programme-making, Geoff set up BBC Switch, a new BBC brand which was aimed at teenagers.

BBC Switch represented a step forward for the BBC, not only in that it reached out to the underserved age group of 12- to 17-year-olds, but also in that it was multi-platform to a degree not seen at the BBC before. BBC Switch spanned television and radio, but at its heart was an online presence. Switch had its own website, www.bbc.co.uk/switch, but, importantly, also hosted content on external third party sites, including Facebook and YouTube.

Switch’s television slot was Saturdays 12pm-2pm on BBC Two. On radio, Switch occupied 7pm onwards on Sunday evenings, and online daily from 5pm.

The team that Geoffrey assembled for the development of BBC Switch included Emma Smithwick and Daniel Heaf (later of Channel 4, BBC Worldwide, and Burberry). The team reported to Jana Bennett, director of TV, and Andy Parfitt, who at that time was the Controller of Radio 1, BBC 1 Xtra and BBC Popular Music. Geoff’s roles spanned across editorial leadership, including commissioning, producing and executive production.

At the time, Geoffrey described BBC Switch as ‘committed to offering the best entertainment for British teens in a way that's authentic and fresh.’

Television

Four programmes originally filled the BBC Two slot of Saturdays 12pm-2pm. Sound was a weekly music entertainment and chat show presented by Annie Mac and Nick Grimshaw. Falcon Beach was a coming-of-age drama about teenagers, their passions, relationships, friends, families and enemies. Them was a documentary series that explored the different teenage tribes that exist in Britain today. The Surgery, presented by Jeff Leach, was a chat show for BBC Switch. The Surgery was the television version of The Sunday Surgery, a radio show presented by Kelly Osbourne, which aimed to help teenagers with everyday problems

Switch’s flagship programme, and one of the first British dramas to air online, The Cut, premiered in 2010. The Cut was unique in that it aired in five-minute webisodes on the Switch website and via YouTube, before showing in an omnibus on BBC Two. Geoffrey commissioned and produced The Cut, which ran for forty episodes with great success. Geoffrey created The Cut with director/producer Sarah Walker, producer Pete Gibbons and the award-winning writer Al Smith. He also worked with directors Laura Smith, Alex Kalymnios and Amy Neil and writers Anna McCleery, Grant Black, Emma Smithwick and Vicki Lutas.

In 2008, Geoffrey commissioned Class Of 2008 for BBC Switch; an observational documentary that featured the fashion model Daisy Lowe. This was a collaboration with Monkey Kingdom Productions, who later went on to make Made in Chelsea.

In 2009, Geoffrey and the Switch team collaborated with Sarah Dillistone at Lime Pictures to make The Season. The Season was a constructed reality programme that followed the lives of a group of ‘saisonnieres’ working in the ‘party capital of the Alps’, Val D’Isere. Lime Pictures later developed the hugely successful The Only Way is Essex.

Revealed..., a journalism and current affairs show which looked at the lives of teens in the UK, presented by Anthony Baxter and Charlotte Ashton, also aired that year, as did Scene Stealers, a "life swap" style format in which teenagers pretend they belong to a different "teen tribe", which Charlie Brooker described as ‘harmless fun’; and docusoap Mission Beach, which followed eight British teenagers taking part in California's renowned Junior Lifeguard Programme.

Meta4orce was an animated interactive detective series about a team of four genetically altered investigators solving high-profile crime cases in the flooded city of London in 2034. It was written by Peter Milligan, a veteran graphic novel writer for DC Comics and Marvel.

Off the Hook was a comedy series about a group of first year university students getting their first taste of independence, starring Jonathan Bailey

The following year, BBC Switch teamed up with Firecracker Productions to create Single, Together, Whatever, a factual programme which followed a group of teenagers over a three-month period, taking a look at their relationships. The same year, Geoffrey’s team collaborated with RSA (Ridley Scott’s production company) to produce Myths, a series of five-minute episodes which told the story of the classic Greek Myths in a modern setting. Popatron, a sitcom based behind the scenes of a celebrity entertainment show also aired that year, as did Shelfstackers, another comedy about four teenagers working at a supermarket.

The last BBC Switch programme was the feature-length musical, Rules of Love, which premiered on 18 December 2010. A contemporary musical set in London, Rules of Love was a modern love story concentrating on the romantic relationship between the young Matt (Jake Roche) and Daisy (Daisy Head), and their friends Jack (Daniel Anthony) and Jess (Sydney Rae White). This was the first modern British urban musical to be made.

Online

The BBC Switch website was a portal linking teens to content across the BBC including BBC Radio 1, BBC Radio 1Xtra, BBC Blast and EastEnders.

BBC Switch was an innovative brand within the BBC in that several of its shows were broadcast across television, radio and online. The 5:19 Show, for example, (a television show hosted by Tom Deacon and AJ Odudu) aired online from Monday to Friday at 5:19pm, but then also had a slot on BBC Two. The show was named 5:19 in recognition of the time most teenagers log-on.

In 2008, Geoffrey commissioned Benched, a quickfire teen match-making show that took place on a park bench. The programme aired as a series of five-minute "webisodes", filmed on different park benches starring teens from the local area. It was available to watch on the BBC Switch website.

In 2009, Geoffrey commissioned and executive produced the BAFTA and international Emmy nominated TV and web series, The Well, a teenage thriller starring Karen Gillan (who later played Amy Pond, assistant to Peter Capaldi’s Doctor Who). The Well aired on BBC Two and extended online to bbc.co.uk/switch, where the audience could immerse themselves further in the story, exploring a spookily atmospheric recreation of the main drama location in a multi-level game.

On Saturday 12 September 2009, the cross-platform Chartjackers aired on BBC 2. This was a documentary that followed four YouTube sensations trying to crowd-source a new track, and get it to number 1. Viewers followed their progress via Twitter and online video blogs, and the result was aired over a half hour on BBC Two. All profits made from the single were donated to Children in Need to help disadvantaged children and young people in the UK.

The Switch brand also included Slink, an online magazine for teenage girls.

Radio

Switch radio programmes that Geoffrey and his team oversaw include The Surgery with Aled and Dr Rhada, a discussion show which focused on issues faced by teenagers and BBC Switch Road Trip with Annie Mac, Nick Grimshaw and Aled Haydn Jones, a musical road trip which took place in live music venues all over the country.

Annie Mac said of BBC Switch "I'm really honoured and excited to be involved with BBC Switch on Sunday nights. The show is going to be like nothing heard on radio before. It's a proper challenge for me and something I can't wait to get stuck in to."

Nick Grimshaw proved a popular choice, largely due to his natural affinity with young people. As his producer, Megan Carver, put it ‘he makes everything accessible. You know, some DJs, when they're talking about the summer holidays, will say, "Great, hanging out with your girlfriend, going to the beach." Grimmy says, "So have you done a big Sainsbury's shop with your mum yet?" He remembers what it's really like to be young."

Switch was unique in the fact that younger viewers' contributions were also aired. Some were even involved in pre- and post-production roles.

Closure of BBC Switch

Director general Mark Thompson's strategic review of the corporation's scope and activities included proposals to close the cross media brands BBC Switch and BBC Blast!, which were both aimed at teenagers. In February 2010, The Guardian and The Times newspapers both reported that the BBC Switch website was under threat of closure, in a review of the BBC's online presence.

On 18 December 2010, BBC Switch closed due to a 25% cut in the BBC Online budget, reducing it by £34 million.

BBC Worldwide

In 2011, following BBC Switch’s closure, Geoffrey joined BBC Worldwide to devise a new commercial culture brand, the BBC Culture Club. Under the working title of 'The BBC Culture Club' this project aimed to build a new global BBC Worldwide consumer brand in the Arts, Culture and Film space. Essentially, this new brand was a highly editorialised video on demand service. In this initiative, Geoffrey reported to John Smith, who was then Head of BBC Worldwide, and is now Chief Operating Officer for Burberry.

The proposal for BBC Culture Club was that credible key talent would be used to present originated, short-form authoritative pieces to introduce and provide context for the long-form films, TV, radio programming and 3rd party partner content such as exhibitions, festivals and other live events. It was characterised as a high quality British heritage brand (similar to, for example, Burberry or The Economist).

40 Partners

In January 2013, after a summer of seed funding, Geoffrey set up his own production company cum talent agency with Chairman Bob Benton, Producer Emma Smithwick and Lawyer Adrian Faulkner.

40 Partners is an unusual business model in that it combines talent management with in house production. The creatives signed to 40 Partners span actors, directors, producers and writers, and each individual is given a stake in the company. The ambition is to create high quality scripted content for broadcast across terrestrial and digital television as well as online platforms such as Netflix and Amazon Prime. The combination of talent management and production means 40 Partners is uniquely placed to develop collaborative relationships between on and off screen talent, and create Intellectual Property content.

So far, 40 Partners has focused on non-scripted content. However, this is set to change in the near future, with several scripted projects in development with the BBC, ITV, Channel 4, Sky and more.

40 Partners credits include 40 Kids by 20 Women (Channel 5 observational documentary), Witness: Confessions of a Hitman (C&I documentary), Being Mum and 30 Something (both series of online shorts for AOL with Tess Daly, Rochelle Humes and Richard Bacon).

AOL

In the Winter of 2016, as Head of Originals and Brand Funded Video, Goodwin and his 40 Partners non-fiction team were brought in-house to super charge AOL UK's video ambitions, producing and / or commissioning  a range of Original series such as Sophie Turner's POWERSHIFT, Fearne Cotton's FEARNE ON FASHION, food show THE CHEF's CHEF with Jason Atherton, Hugh Fearnly-Whittingstall, Thomasina Miers etc. as well as the docu-reality show, THE NEW ACTIVISTS, produced by BAFTA winning producers, Monkey Kingdom.

Alongside these original series, Goodwin was also charged with launching the BUILD Series in London, a long-running entertainment format featuring the biggest stars in the world from TV, Film, Music, etc. Live streamed in front of live studio audience, Build LDN debuted in July 2016 and has gone on to TX of 150 episodes. Similarly, Goodwin's team also oversaw the launch and production of AOL's Female first brand,MAKERS, with video content featuring contributors such as Deliciously Ella and Annie Lennox.

OATH / Verizon Media

Fast forward to June 2017, Goodwin, now Director, Video EMEA at Oath (Verizon owned company that merged AOL and Yahoo!) continues to oversee video, highlighted by significant year on year growth in the company's brand funded video output, including video series delivered for IHG Hotels, Doritos, Danone, Shell, Kellogg's Compare the Market, etc. Over 2 years at the newly named Verizon Media, Goodwin has delivered over 30+ brand funded, video-led campaigns in addition to over 1000+ hours of premium video editorial content shot in our brand new studio; shows include Build, The Royal Box, The Football Show and Yahoo Play App shows such as Beat the Street and Room of Doom. Next up is the 5G challenge of building a 2nd London-based studio to support next gen MoCap, VolCap and Broadcast AR immersive content.

References

Year of birth missing (living people)
Living people
BBC people